Pleurobema curtum, the black clubshell or Curtus's mussel, a species of freshwater mussel, an aquatic bivalve mollusk in the family Unionidae, the river mussels.

This species is endemic to the United States.

References

Molluscs of the United States
curtum
Bivalves described in 1859
ESA endangered species
Taxonomy articles created by Polbot